Roy Stephan Roselló Diaz (born May 1, 1970) is a Puerto Rican pop and gospel singer, businessman, and former member of the popular Puerto Rican group Menudo. Roy currently lives in Brazil, where he focused his musical career and built a family.

Through his membership in Menudo as well as his personal pursuits, he has participated in several television series and shows, such as The Love Boat, The Morning Show, Solid Gold, Good Morning America, and Soul Train, appearing in all the major networks, such as CBS, NBC, SBT and Fox, in addition to several international festivals and award ceremonies, such as the Tokyo Music Festival, where he won the Gold Award.  In 1984, he was a presenter at the Grammys, handing the award for Best Recording for Children to Michael Jackson for his album "E.T. the Extra Terrestrial"

Early life
In his youth, Roy was a player for the Puerto Rican National Children's Soccer Team. 

Roselló was a member of Menudo from August 1983 to January 1986 and debuted on the album A Todo Rock. He recorded a total of eight albums with the group. During his time, Menudo reached great popularity in Asia, more specifically in the Philippines and Japan. They had hits like "Indianápolis" and "Like A Cannonball," which was featured in the film Cannonball Run 2.  It was also during his tenure in the Menudo lineup that the group scored their biggest hit in the United States, "Hold Me." Roy sang lead in the second version of "Ladron De Amor" and is seen prominently in the music video. He also sang lead in the song, "No Hay Reflexion" from the Grammy nominated album Evolucion. He also sang lead in the songs "Transformation" in English, "Alegra Esa Cara" in Spanish and "Alegra Essa Cara" in Portuguese. During concerts and TV appearances he sang lead in the song "Cambiale las Pilas"'s ("Gotta Get On Moving") second Spanish version as well as its English version, "Subete a Mi Moto", "Ghostbusters" and "One Night in Bangkok."

Post-Menudo
He spent 1987 touring the United States, starred in a movie called Star of the Jungle, and was the host of Frente Jovem in 1986, a Brazilian TV show

In 1991, Roy Rosello studied TV production at the Art Institute of Fort Lauderdale in Florida.

More recently, through another TV show in Brazil, he met his long-lost daughter and decided to settle in the South American country. Roy fell in love with the people, the culture, the tropical weather and the hospitality he found in Brazil, his new home.

Since 2006, Roselló has run a Caribbean-themed bar in the city of Campinas, located in the state of São Paulo, Brazil, where he also owns a jewelry store, Roy Rosello Fine Jewelry.

Return to music
In 2009, Roy entered into the Brazilian music scene, when he formed a band of axé and Caribbean music.

A Fazenda

On September 14, 2014, Roy joined as a contestant on the famous Brazilian reality show A Fazenda 7 on TV Record.

On October 21, 2014, Rosello alleged on the show that he and Ricky Martin had been victims of sexual abuse from Edgardo Diaz while Rossello and Martin were members of Menudo.

Discography

With Menudo 
 A Todo Rock (1983)
 Reaching Out (1984)
 Mania (1984)
 Evolucion (1984)
 Menudo (1985)
 Ayer y Hoy (1985)

See also
List of Puerto Ricans

References

External links

1970 births
Living people
People from Río Piedras, Puerto Rico
Menudo (band) members
Puerto Rican expatriates in Brazil
20th-century Puerto Rican male singers
Puerto Rican people of Catalan descent
The Farm (TV series) contestants
Rosselló family